Cupid in a Dental Parlor (also known as Love in the Dental Parlor) is a 1913 American short comedy film directed by Henry Lehrman. Harold Lloyd is said to have appeared in this film, but this is unconfirmed.

Cast
 Fred Mace
 Chester Conklin
 Josef Swickard
 Jewel Carmen (credited as Evelyn Quick)
 Harold Lloyd - (unconfirmed)

See also
 List of American films of 1913
 Harold Lloyd filmography

References

External links

1913 films
Silent American comedy films
American silent short films
1913 comedy films
1913 short films
American black-and-white films
Films directed by Henry Lehrman
American comedy short films
1910s American films